Daniel Nettle (born 1970) is a British behavioural scientist, biologist and social scientist. He is notable for his research that integrates psychology with evolutionary and comparative biology. 
After obtaining a BA in Psychology and Philosophy at Oxford University, Nettle went on to complete a PhD in Biological Anthropology at University College London. He is now a Professor of Behavioural Science at Newcastle University.

Daniel Nettle is the author of several books, most notably, Happiness: The Science Behind Your Smile (2005), Personality: What Makes You the Way You Are (2007), Tyneside Neighbourhoods: Deprivation, Social Life and Social Behaviour in One English City (2015). and Hanging on to the Edges: Essays on Science, Society and the Academic Life. The last two are free open-access e-books. President of European Human Behaviour and Evolution Association (EHBEA) from 2013 to 2016.

References

External links
Daniel Nettle's homepage; this includes downloadable versions of most of his publications.
Download link for Tyneside Neighbourhoods

1970 births
Living people
Alumni of the University of Oxford
Alumni of University College London
Academics of Newcastle University
People associated with The Institute for Cultural Research